Bulgheroni is a surname of Itlaian origin. Notable people with this surname include:

 Alejandro Bulgheroni (born 1944), Argentine businessman in the oil and gas sector
 Carlo Bulgheroni (born 1928), Italian ice hockey player
 Carlos Bulgheroni (1945–2016), Argentine businessman in the nation's energy sector

Italian-language surnames